Ahmad Mohammad Najib Itani (born 23 February 1979) is a Lebanese former footballer who played as a striker. He played for Ahed and Shabab Sahel at club level, and Lebanon internationally.

Honours
Individual
 Lebanese Premier League Team of the Season: 2002–03

References

External links
 
 

Living people
1979 births
Footballers from Beirut
Lebanese footballers
Association football forwards
Lebanese Premier League players
Al Ahed FC players
Shabab Al Sahel FC players
Lebanon international footballers